Aure soavi e liete (HWV 84) ("Soft and Delightful Breezes") is a Baroque dramatic secular cantata in the key of E-flat major composed  by George Frideric Handel in 1707  while he was serving as Kapellmeister to the Ruspoli family in Rome. The author of the text is unknown. Other catalogues of Handel's music have referred to the work as HG l,12 (there is no HHA designation of the work). The cantata is scored for solo soprano voice and basso continuo. It is divided into four separate movements with a typical performance lasting approximately seven and a half minutes.

Background
Handel composed Aure soavi e lieti while a guest of the Francesco Maria Marescotti Ruspoli during his sojourn in Italy. The copyist's bill to Ruspoli for the score is dated 16 May 1707. However, Burrows has proposed that its first performance may have been in March of that year at the Palazzo Ruspoli in Cerveteri. According to Mainwaring, Handel had traveled to Italy in 1706 at the invitation of Ferdinando de' Medici. Other sources say Handel was invited by Gian Gastone de' Medici, whom Handel had met in 1703–1704 in Hamburg. De' Medici, who had a keen interest in opera, was trying to make Florence Italy's musical capital by attracting the leading talents of his day. In 1707 Handel arrived in Rome where for two years he was a guest of Ruspoli, who made him his Kapellmeister.  During this period Handel also composed the antiphon Salve Regina (HWV 241) which was performed in the Ruspoli Castle in Vignanello and the secular cantata Diana Cacciatrice (HWV 79) which was performed at the Palazzo Ruspoli in Cerveteri. His 1707 oratorios La Resurrezione (HWV 47) and  Il trionfo del tempo e del disinganno (HWV 46a), both dedicated to Francesco Maria Marescotti Ruspoli, were performed in Rome at the palaces of the Ruspoli and Ottoboni families. Handel remained in Italy until 1710. Antonio Caldara succeeded him as  Kapellmeister to the Ruspoli family in 1709.

Structure
The work is scored for solo soprano and keyboard (with scattered figured bass markings). The cantata contains two recitative-aria pairings.

Movements
The work consists of four movements:

(Movements do not contain repeat markings unless indicated. The number of bars is the raw number in the manuscript—not including repeat markings. The above is taken from volume 50, starting at page 12, of the Händel-Gesellschaft edition.)

See also
List of cantatas by George Frideric Handel

References

Further sources
 

Friedrich Händels Werke. Band 50 Leipzig: Deutsche Händelgesellschaft, 1887. Plate H.W. 50., n.d. Web. 27 September 2015.
"Handel Secular Cantatas." Stanley Sadie. Gramophone, n.d. Web. 28 September 2015.
Talbot, Michael. Aspects of the Secular Cantata in Late Baroque Italy. Burlington: Ashgate, 2009. Print.
The International Library of Music for Home and Studio. Vol. 1. New York: U Society, 1936. 53-68. Print. Musical Literature.
Bucchianeri, Elizabeth A. New York: Batalha, 2010. Handel's Path to Covent Garden: E.A. Bucchianeri: Books. Print. 28 September 2015.

External links
Aure soavi e liete, HWV 84 (complete score) at the International Music Score Library Project

Cantatas by George Frideric Handel